Sir Francis Hepburn Chevallier-Boutell F.R.G.S (1851-1937) was a British engineer and sports manager, who served as President of the Argentine Association Football League between 1900 and 1906.

Biography 

Chevallier-Boutell was born in Aspall, Suffolk, England, son of Charles Boutell and Mary Chevallier. He studied at the prestigious private school St John's College. Around 1875, he arrived at the Río de la Plata, where was married to Rosa Granero, born in Montevideo.

Established in Buenos Aires he served as a representative of several British railway companies, including the Anglo-Argentine Tramways Company, and East Argentine Railway. He was member of Club del Progreso, Jockey Club, Círculo de Armas and Lomas Athletic Club.

In 1900, Francis Hepburn Chevallier-Boutell was in charge of the AFA, serving as president of this institution until 1906. He organizes the tournament The Tie Cup Competition, an international tournament played between teams from Argentina and Uruguay.

References

External links 

www.fifa.com
archive.org
familysearch.org

1851 births
1937 deaths
People from Buenos Aires
People from Mid Suffolk District
English railway mechanical engineers
English emigrants to Argentina
Presidents of the Argentine Football Association
Río de la Plata